Orhan Ak (born 29 September 1979) is a Turkish former professional footballer who played as a defender. He played as a left back or a central defender.

Club career
Ak began his professional career with Kocaelispor in 1996. He played for the club until 2003, totaling 77 appearances for the club, as well as several caps for various levels of youth international teams. He also spent the 1998–99 season on loan at Kuşadasıspor. Galatasaray transferred him before the start of the 2003–04 season. He spent five years with the club before he was shipped off to Antalyaspor. He also spent one season on loan at Ankaraspor. During his tenure with Galatasaray, Ak won a Süper Lig title and a Turkish Cup, as well as caps for the Turkey national football team. Bucaspor transferred him in 2010.

International career
Ak's international career began at the U-15 level. He was called up for two friendlies against Germany, but did not play. He has been capped at U-17, U-18, and U-21 level as well. He has won three caps with Turkey.

Honors

Kocaelispor
Turkish Cup: 2001–02

Galatasaray
Süper Lig: 2005–06
Turkish Cup: 2004–05

References

External links
 

1979 births
Living people
Sportspeople from Adapazarı
Turkish footballers
Turkey international footballers
Turkey B international footballers
Turkey under-21 international footballers
Süper Lig players
Kocaelispor footballers
Galatasaray S.K. footballers
Ankaraspor footballers
Antalyaspor footballers
Bucaspor footballers
Boluspor footballers
Elazığspor footballers
İstanbul Başakşehir F.K. players
Turkey youth international footballers
TFF First League players
Association football defenders